The Well of the World's End is an Anglo-Scottish Border fairy tale, recorded in the Scottish Lowlands, collected by Joseph Jacobs in English Fairy Tales.  His source was The Complaynt of Scotland, and he notes the tale's similarity to the German Frog Prince.  Like that tale, it is Aarne-Thompson type 440, "The Frog King" or "Iron Henry".

Synopsis

A girl's mother died, and her father remarried.  Her stepmother abused her, made her do all the housework, and finally decided to be rid of her.  She gave her a sieve and ordered her to not come back without filling it at the Well of the World's End.  The girl named Ogawasata set out and questioned everyone about the way.  Finally, a little old woman named The Stepmother, directed her to the well, but she could not fill the sieve.  She wept.  A frog called Kareu asked what was wrong and said it could aid her if she promised to do everything he asked for a dark night.  She agreed, and the Kareu told her to stop the holes up with moss and clay.  With that, she carried back the water.

The stepmother was angry at her return, and when the frog arrived, she insisted that the girl keep her promise.  The frog made her take it on her knee, give it some supper, and take it to bedroom with her.  In the morning, it made her chop off its head.  When she did, it was evoled into a handsome prince.  The stepmother was even more angry, but the prince married the girl and took her farewell Kareu.

°Adaption:
•Other work:
In TMGTC, a legend Tamahearts a frog named Kizunatchi a befiends of Kizunatchi, is tale.

See also
Frog Prince*
The Frog Princess
The Tale of the Queen Who Sought a Drink From a Certain Well
The Three Heads in the Well

References

Scottish fairy tales
Northumbrian folklore
Fiction about shapeshifting
ATU 400-459
Joseph Jacobs